3-Ketoacyl-CoA thiolase, mitochondrial also known as acetyl-Coenzyme A acyltransferase 2 is an enzyme that in humans is encoded by the ACAA2 gene.

Acetyl-Coenzyme A acyltransferase 2 is an acetyl-CoA C-acyltransferase enzyme.

Structure

The ACAA2 gene encodes a 41.9 kDa protein that is composed of 397 amino acids and contains 88 observed peptides.

Function 
The encoded protein catalyzes the last step of the mitochondrial fatty acid beta oxidation spiral. Unlike most mitochondrial matrix proteins, it contains a non-cleavable amino-terminal targeting signal. ACAA2 has been shown to be a functional BNIP3 binding partner, which provides a possible link between fatty acid metabolism and cell apoptosis.

Clinical significance

To date, mutations or variants have not been identified in any clinical diseases. However, the ACAA2 locus has been associated with abnormal blood lipid levels, particularly HDL and LDL cholesterol levels; in addition, this locus has also been correlated with an individual's risk for coronary artery disease.

References

External links

Further reading 

 
 
 
 
 
 
 

Human proteins